Tom Long (3 August 1968 – 4 January 2020) was an Australian film and television actor. He played court official and avid surfer Angus in the late 1990s TV series SeaChange and Brenden Abbott in the 2003 Australian TV movie  The Postcard Bandit.

Early life
Long was born on 3 August 1968 in Boston, Massachusetts, as his Australian parents were visiting there at the time. On their return to Australia he grew up on a farm near Benalla, Victoria. He worked as a jackaroo and shearer after attending Geelong Grammar School, before going abroad, travelling to India, the United Kingdom, Los Angeles, and South Carolina.

After returning to Australia, Long successfully auditioned for a place at the National Institute of Dramatic Art, graduating in 1994.

Career
Long appeared in several Australian television series, most notably the Australian Broadcasting Corporation (ABC) hit SeaChange (1998–2000) and the Nine Network police drama Young Lions (2002). He appeared in the Australian films Two Hands (1999) and The Dish (2000). Long played Brenden Abbott in the 2003 telemovie The Postcard Bandit and appeared in the film The Book of Revelation.

He also appeared in The Last of the Ryans, Doing Time for Patsy Cline, Do or Die, Risk, Heroes Mountain: The Thredbo Story, Black Jack: Ghosts, Joanne Lees: Murder in the Outback, and East of Everything, and Woodley.

Long stopped acting after he collapsed on stage during a performance of the play Coranderrk: We Will Show the Country at the Sydney Opera House in July 2012.

Personal life 
Long was in a long-term relationship with actress Rachael Maza, breaking up in 1998 just before the birth of their son, Ariel. The couple reunited in 2005, after Maza and Ariel survived a deadly car accident, albeit with serious injuries themselves.

Long married Rebecca Fleming in February 2019.

Long was diagnosed in 2012 with multiple myeloma, an incurable blood cancer. He underwent chemotherapy and received stem cell transplant to treat the disease. In December 2018, Long was given an updated prognosis of 3–12 months to live. In March 2019, Long travelled to Seattle, Washington to undergo a medical trial, after which he was pronounced "cancer free".

On 4 January 2020, Long died of encephalitis at age 51.

Filmography
The Leaving of Liverpool (1992, TV Movie) as Ned
Country Life (1994) as Billy Livingstone
The Last of the Ryans (1997, TV Movie) as Peter Walker
Doing Time for Patsy Cline (1997) as Brad Goodall
SeaChange (1998–2000, TV series) as Angus Kabiri
Two Hands (1999) as Wally
Strange Planet (1999) as Ewan
Risk (2000) as Ben Madigan
The Dish (2000) as Glenn Latham
Do or Die (2001, TV Mini-Series) as Michael Tyler / Joey
Hildegarde (2001) as Tony
Young Lions (2002, TV series) as Det. Sr. Const. Guy 'Guido' Martin
Heroes Mountain: The Thredbo Story (2002, TV Movie) as Paul Featherstone
The Postcard Bandit (2003, TV Movie) as Brenden Abbott
The Book of Revelation (2006) as Daniel
Black Jack: Ghosts (2006, TV Movie) as Mike
Joanne Lees: Murder in the Outback (2007, TV Movie) as Tony
East of Everything (2008–2009, TV Series) as Vance Watkins
Woodley (2012, TV Series) as Greg (final appearance)

References

External links

Interview : Web Wombat Movie Channel

Australian male film actors
Australian male television actors
Male actors from Victoria (Australia)
National Institute of Dramatic Art alumni
Male actors from Boston
People from Benalla
1968 births
2020 deaths
People with multiple myeloma
Deaths from encephalitis